The rufous-necked foliage-gleaner (Syndactyla ruficollis) is a species of bird in the family Furnariidae. It is found in Ecuador and Peru. Its natural habitats are subtropical or tropical dry forests, subtropical or tropical moist lowland forests, and subtropical or tropical moist montane forests. It is threatened by habitat loss.

References

External links
BirdLife Species Factsheet.
Image at ADW

rufous-necked foliage-gleaner
Birds of Ecuador
Birds of Peru
rufous-necked foliage-gleaner
rufous-necked foliage-gleaner
Taxonomy articles created by Polbot